The Highfill Community Center, formerly the Highfill School, is a historic school building at 11978 Highfill Avenue in Highfill, Arkansas, at its northeast corner with 4th Street.  It is a single-story frame structure, finished with wooden clapboard siding and a hip roof.  The main entrance is on one of the short sides, sheltered by a hipped hood and flanked by sash windows.  The building was constructed about 1911 to serve as a school for district 71, which covered the town.  The school was consolidated into the system of nearby Gentry in 1948, and the building was retained for use as a community center, a role it continues to play today.

It may be a one-room schoolhouse.

The building was listed on the National Register of Historic Places in 2018.

See also
National Register of Historic Places listings in Benton County, Arkansas

References

School buildings on the National Register of Historic Places in Arkansas
One-room schoolhouses in Arkansas
School buildings completed in 1911
National Register of Historic Places in Benton County, Arkansas
1911 establishments in Arkansas